Stacey Glick (born  in Brooklyn, New York) is a former American child actress who is now a literary agent. 

Her most prominent roles came in the late-1980s in the films Brighton Beach Memoirs (1986) and Three O'Clock High (1987). The latter was also her last film role.

Glick got into acting when a manager of the Miss Long Island Contest saw promise in her acting skills and sent her to a theatrical agent.  She soon got spots in a number of commercials, starting with one for Thomas' English Muffins.  Her film debut came in the 1981 TV movie The Day the Loving Stopped, where she played a younger version of the role played by Ally Sheedy in the movie.(22 October 1981). TV aside, Stacey really wants to be a 'rock star', Newsday, p. 9 (paywall)  She also appeared in the Off-Broadway production of Twelve Dreams at The Public Theater and for some time on the NBC soap opera Search for Tomorrow

Glick went to high school at South Side High School in Rockville Centre, New York, missing her first day due to filming for Brighton Beach Memoirs.

After college Glick worked in film/TV development for five years, and then became a literary agent.Schultz, Ricki (7 October 2012). Literary Agent Interview: Stacey Glick of Dystel & Goderich Literary Management, Writer's DigestCynthia Leitich Smith. Guest Post: Author Deborah Lytton & Agent Stacey Glick on Middle Grade Series Proposals, Retrieved 6 October 2022

References

External links

American film actresses
American child actresses
Living people
Literary agents
21st-century American women
Year of birth missing (living people)